"Time to Move On" is a song by Tom Petty from his second solo studio album Wildflowers (1994). A live version was released on the live disc of the 2020 box set Wildflowers & All the Rest. The song is similar to the title track, in the same vein but with some orchestration.

Critical reception
AllMusic described the song as a lesser-known masterpiece by Tom Petty, and a highlight on the album. It was described as reminiscent of "Go and Say Goodbye" by Buffalo Springfield, although the song also has life's road and challenges as a theme.

Popularity
While the song was not played live very often by Tom Petty (60 times with the Heartbreakers and once alone), it became quite popular on streaming services: it is Petty's seventh most streamed solo song on Spotify, surpassing popular singles that were live staples, such as "Yer So Bad" and "It's Good to Be King".

References

Sources
 

1994 songs
Songs written by Tom Petty
Tom Petty songs